Niclas Weiland (born 22 July 1972) is a German former professional footballer. He spent two seasons in the Bundesliga with 1. FSV Mainz 05. His brother Dennis is also a former footballer.

Honours 
Hannover 96
 DFB-Pokal: 1991–92

External links 
 

1972 births
Living people
German footballers
Footballers from Hanover
Association football forwards
Bundesliga players
2. Bundesliga players
Hannover 96 players
FC St. Pauli players
Rot-Weiß Oberhausen players
Tennis Borussia Berlin players
1. FSV Mainz 05 players